Swedish model may refer to:

 Nordic model, sociopolitical model
 Nordic model approach to prostitution (see also Prostitution in Sweden)

See also
 Top Model Sverige